Entedoninae is a subfamily of wasps in the family Eulophidae which includes over 90 genera.

Genera
The genera included in Entendoninae are:

Acanthala Hansson, 2000 
Achrysocharoides Girault, 1913 
Afrotroppopsis Gumovsky, 2007 
Aleuroctonus LaSalle and Schauff, 1994 
Ambocybe Ubaidillah and LaSalle, 2000 
Ametallon Ashmead, 1904 
Apleurotropis Girault, 1913 
Asecodes Förster, 1856 
Astichomyiia Girault, 1917 
Baeoentedon Girault, 1915 
Bridarolliella De Santis, 1949 
Cabeza Hansson and LaSalle, 2003 
Ceranisus Walker, 1842 
Chrysocharis Förster, 1856 
Chrysocharodes Ashmead, 1894 
Chrysonotomyia Ashmead, 1904 
Closterocerus Westwood, 1833 
Clypecharis Gumovsky, 2003 
Clypomphale Boucek, 1988 
Colpixys Waterston, 1916 
Cornugon Hansson, 2011 
Dasyomphale LaSalle and Schauff, 1994 
Davincia Girault, 1924 
Dentalion Hansson, 2011 
Derostenoides Girault, 1915
Derostenus Westwood, 1833 
Dinopteridion Hansson, 2004 
Driopteron Hansson, 2004 
Dubeyiella Khan, Agnohitri and Sushil, 2005 
Emersonella Girault, 1916 
Encyrtomphale Girault, 1915 
Entedon Dalman, 1820 
Entedonomphale Girault, 1915 
Entedononecremnus Girault, 1915 
Epichrysoatomus Girault, 1916 
Eprhopalotus Girault, 1916 
Euderomphale Girault, 1916 
Goetheana Girault, 1920 
Grassator De Santis, 1948 
Hakuna Gumovsky and Boucek, 2006 
Holarcticesa Koçak and Kemal, 2010 
Horismenoides Girault, 1913 
Horismenus Walker, 1843 
Inti Hansson, 2010 
Ionympha Graham, 1959 
Itahipeus Hansson and LaSalle, 2003 
Janicharis Gumovsky and Delvare, 2006 
Klyngon Hansson, 2005 
Kokandia Efremova and Kriskovich, 1995 
Mestocharis Förster, 1878 
Microdonophagus Schauff, 1986 
Monteithius Boucek, 1988 
Monterrondo Hansson and LaSalle, 2003 
Myrmobomyia Gumovsky and Boucek, 2005 
Myrmokata Boucek, 1972 
Neochrysocharis Kurdjumov, 1912 
Neopediobopsis Narendran, 1994 
Neopomphale LaSalle and Schauff, 1994
Obesulus Boucek, 1988 
Omphale Haliday, 1833 
Omphalentedon Girault, 1915 
Oradis Hansson, 2002 
Paphagus Walker, 1843 
Paracrias Ashmead, 1904 
Parahorismenus Girault, 1915 
Parzaommomyia Girault, 1915 
Pediobius Walker, 1846 
Pediobomyia Girault, 1913 
Pediobopsis Girault, 1913 
Pediocharis Boucek, 1988 
Pelorotelus Ashmead, 1904 
Perditorulus Hansson, 1996 
Piekna Boucek, 1988 
Platocharis Kerrich, 1969 
Pleurotropopseus Girault, 1913 
Pleurotroppopsis Girault, 1913 
Pomphale Husain, Rauf and Kudeshia, 1983 
Proacrias H. von Ihering, 1914 
Rhynchentedon Girault, 1919 
Sanyangia Yang, 1996 
Sarasvatia Hedqvist, 1976
Schizocharis Kerrich, 1969 
Shardiella Sushil and Khan, 1997 
Sifraneurus Hansson and LaSalle, 2003 
Sporrongia Gumovsky, 1998 
Tanava Brèthes, 1918 
Thripobius Ferrière, 1938 
Tropicharis Hansson, 1998 
Uroderostenus Ashmead, 1904 
Xenopomphale Hansson and LaSalle, 2003 
Xiphentedon Risbec, 1957 
Zaommomentedon Girault, 1915 
Zaommomyiella Girault, 1913

References

Eulophidae
Hymenoptera subfamilies
Taxa named by Arnold Förster